The 2009–10 SK Rapid Wien season is the 112th season in club history.

Squad statistics

Goal scorers

Fixtures and results

Bundesliga

League table

Cup

Europa League

Qualification

Group stage

References

2009-10 Rapid Wien Season
Austrian football clubs 2009–10 season